The British Grand Prix is a Grand Prix motor race organised in the United Kingdom by the Royal Automobile Club. First held in 1926, the British Grand Prix has been held annually since 1948 and has been a round of the FIA Formula One World Championship every year since 1950. In 1952, following the transfer of the lease of the Silverstone Circuit to the British Racing Drivers' Club, the RAC delegated the organisation of the race to the BRDC for the first time, and this arrangement has continued for all British Grands Prix held at Silverstone since then (organisation of British Grands Prix held at Aintree having meanwhile been similarly delegated to the British Automobile Racing Club).

The British Grand Prix is currently held at the Silverstone Circuit near the village of Silverstone in Northamptonshire in England.

It and the Italian Grand Prix are the only two Formula One World Championship Grands Prix that have been staged during every season that the championship has been held. The British Grand Prix was a round of the World Manufacturers' Championship in both 1926 and 1927, but was never held during the existence of the European Championship. It was designated the European Grand Prix five times between 1950 and 1977, when this title was an honorary designation given each year to one Grand Prix race in Europe. All British Grands Prix dating back to 1926 have been held in England, where the British motor racing industry is primarily located.

The event is due to take place at Silverstone Circuit until at least 2024.

History

Brooklands (1926–1927)
The concrete Brooklands oval was built in 1907 near Weybridge in Surrey, located just outside the British capital of London. It was the first purpose-built motor racing venue, as well as one of the first airfields in the United Kingdom. Grand Prix motor racing first came to Britain in 1926, following the successes of Henry Segrave in winning the 1923 French Grand Prix and the San Sebastián Grand Prix the following year, both in a Sunbeam Grand Prix car, which raised interest in the sport domestically and demonstrated to the AIACR that the advances made in the British motor industry merited the honour of hosting an international grand prix motor race. The first ever British Grand Prix (officially known as the Grand Prix of the Royal Automobile Club) was held at Brooklands on 7 August 1926 and was won by Robert Sénéchal and Louis Wagner driving a Delage 15 S 8. The second Grand Prix of the RAC was also held at Brooklands, on 1 October 1927, and was again won by a Delage 15 S 8, this time driven by Robert Benoist.

Several non-championship races known as the Donington Grand Prix were held at Donington Park in Leicestershire near Derby which attracted the best European teams in 1937 and 1938, where the German Mercedes and Auto Unions dominated the proceedings. The German Bernd Rosemeyer and the Italian Tazio Nuvolari (both driving mid-engined Auto Union cars) won this race in 1937 and 1938, respectively, but as the races were organised by the Derby & District Motor Club rather than by (or on behalf of) the Royal Automobile Club, they are not usually accorded the "British Grand Prix" title.

Silverstone (1948–1954)

Brooklands had been severely damaged by the onset of World War II and the circuit was abandoned. Most new British circuits were being built on disused Royal Air Force airfields, and Silverstone, located on the Northamptonshire/Buckinghamshire border in central England equidistant between London and Birmingham (the latter being the capital of the UK production car industry)- was one of those circuits. It staged its first race, the Royal Automobile Club International Grand Prix on 2 October 1948, which was won by Italian Luigi Villoresi in a Maserati. In 1949, the circuit was heavily modified and made very fast; and it remained in this configuration for decades.

In 1950, the World Championship of Drivers was introduced, and the 1950 British Grand Prix was the first World Championship Formula One race ever held, with new regulations and 6 other races in Europe. This race was won by Alfa Romeo driver Giuseppe "Nino" Farina. King George VI was among the attendees of the race. The 1951 race was particularly exciting, as it was the first F1 race not won by an Alfa Romeo; the gas-guzzling Italian cars were beaten by another Italian car- the more fuel-efficient Ferrari of Argentine José Froilán González in what was the famed Scuderia's first ever Formula One victory.  For the 1952 event, the original pits between Abbey and Woodcote were abandoned and demolished. A new pit complex was constructed between Woodcote and Copse corners; Alberto Ascari dominated this and the next year's race; González won again in 1954 in a Ferrari.

Silverstone and Aintree (1955–1962)

In 1955, the Formula One circus began to alternate between Silverstone and the Aintree circuit, located on the Grand National horse racing course near Liverpool. Mercedes drivers Juan Manuel Fangio and home favourite Stirling Moss arrived at Aintree expecting to win. They took the lead at the start and the two drivers battled throughout, and Moss passed Fangio on the 26th lap, and he kept the lead for a while; but Fangio fought back and was about to pass Moss on the last corner on the last lap, and all were certain Fangio would pip Moss at the chequered flag. But he didn't, and Moss won his first Formula One race on home soil. Moss later asked Fangio "did you let me through?" and the Argentine replied "No. You were better than me that day." Mercedes romped to the finish 1-2-3-4, with German Karl Kling and Italian Piero Taruffi finishing 3rd and 4th.

The even-numbered years were at Silverstone and the odd numbered and 1962 were at Aintree. 1956 saw Fangio win in a Ferrari, and 1957 returned to see Moss win again in a Vanwall; he took over his ill teammate Tony Brooks's car and stormed through the field to take victory. This was the first Grand Prix victory for a British-built car- Formula One would soon be mostly made up of British teams. 1958 was when Peter Collins won in a Ferrari and Bernie Ecclestone was entered in a Connaught but his car was driven by Jack Fairman, and 1959 and 1960 saw Australian Jack Brabham win in a mid-engined Cooper. The last race at Aintree was in 1962 when Briton Jim Clark won his first of 5 British Grands Prix; Aintree was decommissioned in 1964.

Silverstone and Brands Hatch (1963–1986)

1964 saw the first Formula One race at the southern English circuit known as Brands Hatch, located in ancient woodlands in Kent, just outside London. The track was built in the early 1950s and had been extended in 1960 to include the new Grand Prix course. Silverstone hosted the British Grand Prix in odd-numbered years and Brands Hatch in even-numbered years. Like Silverstone, the circuit was popular with drivers, and unlike the flat Northamptonshire circuit and Aintree, Brands Hatch had many cambered corners and varying elevation. Like the year before at Silverstone, Clark won the 1964 race and the next year's race. 1967 saw Clark take yet another dominant win, and 1968 saw a monumental battle between Swiss Jo Siffert in a Lotus and New Zealander Chris Amon in a Ferrari; Siffert won the race, his first of two victories in F1 on the circuit where he would lose his life in a non-championship race three years later.

1969 saw another big battle between home favourite Jackie Stewart and Austrian Jochen Rindt, that went on for a while; although Rindt had a loose rear wing and had to come into the pits to get it repaired; Stewart took the chequered flag driving a Ford/Cosworth-powered Matra for Ken Tyrrell. Rindt won the 1970 event at the expense of Brabham running out of fuel at the end of the race, and 1971 saw Stewart win again in a Tyrrell (Ken Tyrrell had started building his own cars). 1973, however, saw a huge first lap accident at Woodcote that took out 11 cars, including all three works Surtees cars. Amazingly, there were no deaths or any fires and the worst news was that Andrea de Adamich received career-ending ankle injuries. 1974 saw Austrian up-and-comer Niki Lauda dominate the race in his Ferrari, however, a rear-tire puncture slowed his car and rivals Jody Scheckter and Emerson Fittipaldi passed Lauda to take 1st and 2nd.

1975 saw a chicane added to Woodcote to slow cars going through the very high-speed corner; and this was another race of variables as a rainstorm hit the track and a number of drivers including Scheckter and Briton James Hunt hydroplaned off the track at the same corner; Fittipaldi won the race after it was called short.  1976 also saw changes to Brands Hatch including making the fearsome Paddock Hill bend a bit tamer, South Bank corner more of a left-hand apex rather than a long hairpin and moving Bottom Straight further south so that the pits and paddock area could be expanded. This race proved to be very controversial; as home favourite Hunt won the race but was later disqualified following a protest from Ferrari and other teams about Hunt not completing the first lap of the race; and the victory went to second-placed Lauda. 1977 saw Hunt take victory without any controversy and when F1 returned to Silverstone two years later, Australian Alan Jones lapped the circuit more than 6 seconds inside the lap record in his ground-effect Williams. His teammate Clay Regazzoni won the race, Williams's first F1 victory. 1980 saw Jones win after the Ligiers of Jacques Laffite and Didier Pironi retired; and 1981 saw French rising star Alain Prost thoroughly dominate the first part race in his Renault; and there was an accident involving Canadian Gilles Villeneuve at the Woodcote Chicane which held up Briton John Watson; but Watson passed several cars and won the race; the first for a car with an all-carbon fibre chassis. 1982 saw polesitter Keke Rosberg having to start from the back due to problems with his Williams and he began a charge that brought him far up the field; but he retired, and there was another spectacular showing from Briton Derek Warwick in his underfunded Toleman; he managed to pass Pironi for 2nd, but he also retired with a broken driveshaft; the victory went to Austrian Lauda.

1983 saw Prost win his first of five British Grands Prix and a spectacular performance from Briton Nigel Mansell in his first outing in a turbocharged Lotus, he started 16th and finished 4th. Lauda won again at Brands Hatch in 1984, during which FISA president Jean-Marie Balestre announced that the Tyrrell team was to be excluded from that year's championship for fuel irregularities, and the restarted race after a huge accident at Bottom Bend caused more controversy; Prost and Lauda had passed Brazilian Nelson Piquet on the last lap of the first race, but Piquet started in front of the two McLaren drivers; regulations dictated that the positions were on the grid were to be determined two laps before the restart was called; and an irate Prost made scathing comments about his countryman Balestre.

Silverstone, which was already a very fast circuit, was becoming faster and faster and the cars were lapping the circuit in the low 1-minute range. The race was an exciting one with Brazilian rising star Ayrton Senna making a great start from 4th and taking the lead by the first corner. He led until late in the race when his car was running out of fuel while Prost was pushing him hard; Senna eventually ran out of fuel and Prost went on to take victory. 1986 saw a huge crowd thanks to Mansell being a favourite to win; his newly found fame and place in a competitive team would help the British Grand Prix to see huge crowds for several years. This race saw 42-year-old Jacques Laffite get involved in a first corner accident and slam head-on into the barriers, breaking both his legs and ending his Formula One career. Nigel Mansell, whose car broke at the start of the first race, got into his teammate Piquet's spare car and won the race; although this was the last F1 race at Brands Hatch. A number of people had concerns about the speeds of the cars on the small track; particularly the European Grand Prix held at Brands Hatch the previous year. But Brands Hatch's demise was for other reasons: the international motorsports governing body at the time,  (FISA), had instituted a policy of long-term contracts for one circuit per Grand Prix. Brands Hatch was perceived as a poorer facility, and considering most of the track was located in a very old forest it did have very little run-off and room to expand, something Silverstone had in acres. Silverstone and the BRDC had signed a seven-year contract with Formula 1 and FISA at some point in 1986, to run from 1987 to 1993.

Silverstone's evolution (1987–present)

1987 saw Silverstone modified; the Woodcote chicane was no longer used and a new left-right chicane was built on the Farm Straight just before Woodcote. Silverstone's layout, like Brands Hatch, had changed little since 1949. The circuit was still fast, and it saw Mansell charge after Piquet (who had decided to run the whole race on one set of tyres) and the British driver broke the lap record 11 times, caught and passed Piquet and took victory; the Silverstone crowd broke ranks and ran onto the circuit after the race was over; this was to start a number of dramatic events surrounding Mansell for the next 5 years. 1988 saw Senna win a rain-soaked event, and Mansell finished 2nd after driving very hard and passing many cars to attempt to catch Senna; this was one of Mansell's two race finishes that season. 1989 saw Prost win in a McLaren after his teammate Senna went off at Becketts; Mansell finished 2nd again driving for Ferrari; and sometime after the event, it was decided that Silverstone, the fastest circuit on the Formula One calendar, was to be heavily modified, and the project would be completed for 1991. The 1990 Grand Prix was the last motor race on the high-speed circuit; and Mansell drove hard and led a lot of the race; but gearbox problems eventually forced him to retire, where he threw his gloves into the crowd and announced that he was going to retire, a decision that he would later take back; and he effectively dominated the next two events, driving for Williams. The circuit was now more technical, 15 percent slower and every corner on the circuit except Copse was different. It also included an infield section right before the pits. After 1992, Mansell had retired from F1, and 1993 saw new Williams driver Damon Hill lead much of the race until his engine blew up, and Hill's French teammate Alain Prost took his 50th career Grand Prix win.

After the tragedies of Imola in 1994, a chicane was installed at the flat-out Abbey corner 6 weeks before the event was due to take place and Stowe corner was slowed considerably. Hill won the event, something his double world champion father Graham never did. 1995 saw another British driver, Johnny Herbert, take victory in his Benetton. 1996 saw further changes to the circuit, where Stowe was more or less restored to its 1991 design, and the 1999 event saw double world champion Michael Schumacher crash heavily at Stowe; he broke his leg, missed many races and this put him out of championship contention. There were attempts to bring the British GP back to Brands Hatch for 2002, but this never materialised.

Marshals were able to get him off the track before he hurt himself or anyone else and he was later arrested; Brazilian Rubens Barrichello won the race for Ferrari. A dispute between Silverstone's owners, the British Racing Drivers' Club (BRDC), and the Formula One authorities in 2003 over the funding of necessary improvements to the track's facilities led to doubts over the future of the race. In October 2004 the British Grand Prix was left off the preliminary race schedule for 2005 because the BRDC refused to pay the race fee demanded by Bernie Ecclestone. However, after months of negotiation between the BRDC, Ecclestone and the Formula One constructors, a deal was made for the Grand Prix to be held at Silverstone until 2009. 2008 saw Briton Lewis Hamilton win in pouring rain for McLaren; Hamilton and Jenson Button’s presence and success in Formula One helped to see huge crowds at Silverstone not seen since Nigel Mansell’s time in the sport. On 4 July, it was announced that Donington Park had been awarded the contract to host the British Grand Prix for 10 years from 2010. However, Donington failed to secure the necessary funding to host the race, and its contract was terminated in November 2009. On 7 December 2009, Silverstone signed a 17-year contract to host the British Grand Prix from 2010 onwards. The 2010 race saw a new circuit configuration being used, using the brand new "Arena" layout. For 2011 a new pit complex was built between Club and Abbey Corners, to where the start/finish line was moved. Silverstone is still a very fast circuit- with average speeds up in the  range for Formula 1 cars; one of the highest average speeds on the F1 calendar.

On 11 July 2017, the BRDC, the owners of Silverstone, activated a break clause in their contract meaning unless a new contract was signed, 2019 would be the final year the British Grand Prix took place at Silverstone. However, in July 2019 a few days before the 2019 edition it was confirmed that Silverstone was contracted to host the British Grand Prix until at least 2024.

In September 2022, Silverstone was criticised during the initial sale of tickets for the 2023 British Grand Prix. The track instituted a 'dynamic pricing' model of prices refreshing every 90 seconds based on demand, and then encouraged fans to access its online ticketing system immediately after sales began. The rush of fans led to surges in pricing and crashes to the ticket sales website. Silverstone was forced to suspend sales and apologise to fans.

Venues

Trophies and awards

The Royal Automobile Club Trophy 
Since 1950, it has been customary that the winner of the race is awarded the official RAC British Grand Prix Trophy, a perpetual trophy awarded each year and then returned to the Royal Automobile Club, where it is permanently housed. From 1950 until 1972, the official trophy was the Mervyn O'Gorman Trophy, but this was replaced from 1973 by the present gold cup.

Sponsor's Trophy 
Since 1952, the winner of the British Grand Prix has generally also been awarded a trophy by the principal sponsor of the race (for 1952, the Daily Express), which is won outright each year and replaced by a new trophy for the following year's event. In some years, it is the sponsor's trophy, rather than the official RAC trophy, which is handed to the winner on the podium, which is why post-race photographs since 1950 have shown many more than the two official trophies that have ever been awarded.

Prize money 
Before the institution of a winner's trophy, the only award for being placed in the British Grand Prix was the prize money on offer. For the first two British Grands Prix held at Brooklands, the prize money was £1,000 to the winner, £300 to the second-placed finisher and £200 for finishing third. For the first post-Second World War British Grand Prix in 1948, prize money was offered to the entrants of the top ten finishers, ranging from £500 to the winner to £20 for tenth place, and the amounts awarded changed little over the next few years, although by 1958 the winner's prize had increased to £750.

A cash prize was also awarded for the fastest lap of the race from 1948, when the prize amounted to £25. By 1953, this prize was no longer offered.

Fred G. Craner Memorial Trophy 
In addition to the official winner's trophy, in 1950 the RAC also awarded for the first time a further perpetual trophy, the Fred G. Craner Memorial Car Trophy, for the highest-placed British competitor driving a British car, which was awarded until at least 1972. Fred Craner had been secretary of the Derby & District Motor Club and instrumental in establishing Donington Park as a motor racing circuit and in organising the Donington Grands Prix. The first winner of this trophy was F R "Bob" Gerard driving an ERA, who finished fifth overall. The first occasion on which the winners of the British Grand Prix also won the Fred G. Craner Memorial Trophy was at Aintree in 1957, when the winners were Stirling Moss and Tony Brooks driving a Vanwall.

Chief Mechanic's Award 
From 1948 until at least 1953, the chief mechanic of the winning car was awarded a prize. From 1948 the prize was the RAC Plaque, but by 1952 this had become a cash prize of £25.

Sir Arthur Stanley Cup 
For the first British Grand Prix in 1926, Sir Arthur Stanley, president of the RAC from 1905 to 1936 presented a cup for the fastest lap of the race, which was won outright by Henry Segrave.

Winners

Multiple winners (drivers)
Drivers in bold are competing in the Formula One championship in the current season.

Multiple winners (constructors)
Teams in bold are competing in the Formula One championship in the current season.
A green background indicates an event which was part of the pre-war World Manufacturers' Championship.
A pink background indicates an event which was not part of the Formula One World Championship.

Multiple winners (engine manufacturers)
Manufacturers in bold are competing in the Formula One championship in the current season.
A green background indicates an event which was part of the pre-war World Manufacturers' Championship.
A pink background indicates an event which was not part of the Formula One World Championship.

* Built by Cosworth, funded by Ford

** Between 1999 and 2005 built by Ilmor, funded by Mercedes

*** Built by Porsche

By year

A green background indicates an event which was part of the AIACR World Manufacturers' Championship.
A pink background indicates an event which was not part of the Formula One World Championship.

References

External links 

 
Formula One Grands Prix
Pre-World Championship Grands Prix
National Grands Prix
Grand Prix
Recurring sporting events established in 1926
1926 establishments in the United Kingdom